Crno Boci is a village in the municipality of Centar Župa, North Macedonia. Crno Boci, a former neighbourhood of the village of Balanci was elevated in the 1960s to the status of an independent village. The population density of the village is 6.4 km2.

Name 
The toponym Crno Boci is derived from the name of a pagan Slavic deity Chernobog (Black God).

Demographics
Crno Boci has traditionally been inhabited by a Muslim Macedonian (Torbeš) population.

As of the 2021 census, Crno Boci had 30 residents with the following ethnic composition:
Turks 30

According to the 2002 census, the village had a total of 40 inhabitants. Ethnic groups in the village include:
Turks 40

References

Villages in Centar Župa Municipality
Macedonian Muslim villages
Turkish communities in North Macedonia